Laurence Anthony Robertson (born 29 March 1958) is a British Conservative Party politician. He has been Member of Parliament (MP) for Tewkesbury since 1997 and served as Chair of the Northern Ireland Affairs Committee for seven years, from 2010 to 2017.

Early life
Robertson was born in Bolton, Lancashire. His father was a miner, a postman, a delivery man then a milkman. His mother was an office worker in Manchester.

He was educated at St James's C.E. Secondary Modern School and Farnworth Grammar School, both located in Farnworth, and afterwards at Bolton Institute of Higher Education (now the University of Bolton), gaining a diploma in Management Services.

Early career
Before entering Parliament, Robertson held a number of roles which included him working as a charity fundraiser, public relations consultant, company director, factory owner from 1987 to 1988, industrial management consultant from 1983 to 1989, and work study engineer from 1977 to 1983.

From 1988 to 1991, Robertson was Chairman of Governors of a primary school, a visitor for Victim Support Scheme, and the area chairman for the Campaign for Law and Order.

Political career
Robertson was an unsuccessful candidate when he stood for Bolton Council in the Derby ward in 1983 and in the Burnden ward in 1986. He was an unsuccessful candidate for Parliament in the Makerfield constituency at the 1987 general election and again in the Ashfield constituency at the 1992 general election.

In May 1997, Robertson was elected as the Member of Parliament for Tewkesbury, winning with a majority of 9,234.

Robertson stood on "an unashamedly British ticket, fighting against European federalism and stressing the need for and benefits of preserving the United Kingdom of Great Britain and Northern Ireland."

On 21 May 1997, Robertson made his maiden speech during the Referendums (Scotland and Wales) Bill, in which he spoke out against devolution.

Robertson courted controversy in May 2001 by ignoring James Cran's advice not to publicly express support for John Townend. Robertson endorsed Townend's controversial remarks about race on BBC's Newsnight saying that Townend's remarks were "basically true" and "having too many people in different multi-racial groups makes society very difficult to manage, especially in certain parts of the country. It is not that easy to manage that kind of society."

Robertson was forced to apologise after being given an ultimatum to either apologise, retract his remarks and promise not to repeat them or to be stripped of the Conservative party whip. Robertson was reported to have told colleagues that he received a lot of support, and was told by the Tewkesbury constituency chairman that he should not have backed down.

Following the incident, Robertson apologised. Since then, Robertson has used his platform to speak out against racism. In 2019, Robertson brought attention to the matter of racism in football to the Department for Digital, Culture, Media and Sport Minister, Nigel Adams, branding supporters who abuse people because of the colour of their skin as "absolutely shameful".

During the expenses scandal, it was flagged that between 2001 and 2011, Robertson had claimed more than £1 million in MP's expenses and criticised plans to overhaul the system of claims for MPs. However, in October 2020, Robertson spoke out against IPSA proposed pay rise for Members of Parliament in a statement on his website.

Between 2004 and 2005, Robertson led a successful campaign to save Alderman Knight, a local special needs school for children additional learning difficulties, complex needs and Autistic Spectrum Disorders (ASD) from closure. On 8 September 2004, Robertson secured a debate in the House of Commons to discuss the schools closure. During the debate Robertson read out letters he had been sent by students advocating for the school to remain open and made it clear to Minister that he would do everything in his power "to save the school by legal and campaigning means".

On 24 March 2005, the Schools Adjudicator ruled that Alderman Knight would close. During a question to the Minister of Education on the matter of special schools in the House of Commons that day, Robertson accused Minister for Children, Young People and Families Margaret Hodge of providing an "inadequate" and "dishonest" answer after failing to mention the school in her figures. When ordered by Speaker Michael Martin to withdraw the remark, Robertson refused, stating: "Mr Speaker, I am here to represent my constituents. I will not withdraw that remark." He was therefore asked to leave the chamber. This was reported in national press, bringing attention to the school and its importance in the area.

Later that year, following the May local government elections, the Conservatives took control of the council and pledged to keep the school open.

Following the 2007 floods in Tewkesbury, Robertson spoke out against building on flood plains. An issue that Robertson raised once again to Secretary of State for Environment, Food and Rural Affairs in February 2020 following heavy flooding in his constituency. Robertson is Vice Chair of the All-Party Parliamentary Group on Flood Prevention, and continues to lobby the government on the issue of flooding.

In March 2016, Robertson was accused of "cash for access" after it was reported that he sponsored a parliamentary pass for a lobbyist, Jennifer Bryant-Pearson, in 2014 whose company paid him £7,500 for consultancy advice in 2009 and 2010. Robertson was paid between £9,000 and £10,000 a year by the environmental services company Veolia, which is among Bryant-Pearson's major clients. Robertson went onto clarify: "I received and registered payments from Westminster Parliamentary Research, the last of which was received by me on 28th May 2010. Jennifer Bryant-Pearson held a Parliamentary pass through me from 6th January 2014 to 30th March 2015. There was therefore a gap of almost four years between the ending of my consultancy work with the company and her obtaining a pass."In 2019, Robertson along with his colleagues, led a successful campaign to save Cheltenham's Accident and Emergency Department from closure.

However, as a result of the COVID-19 pandemic, Cheltenham A&E was temporarily closed. On 30 September 2020, Robertson brought the issue to light once again during Prime Ministers Questions, asking the prime minister to ensure the return of the A&E at Cheltenham General Hospital, to which the Prime Minister confirmed that the closure was a "temporary measure".

Robertson began a job at the Betting and Gaming Council in October 2020 as the parliamentary advisor on sport and safer gambling. He is paid £2000 for 10 hours a month work, equivalent to £24,000 a year. He has said he will not advocate for the betting industry despite tougher regulations being set to be introduced.

Register of Members' Interests 

From 11 May 2020 to 19 November 2021, Robertson received a total of £3,085 for participating in 41 surveys from three polling companies, YouGov, Savanta ComRes and Populus.

Since 1 October 2020 (until 30 September 2022), Robertson has been acting as the Parliamentary Adviser on Sport and Safer Gambling to the Betting and Gaming Council, based in London, for which he receives £2,000 for 10 hours work per month. (Registered 26 October 2020; updated 6 October 2021).

Sporting events 
Robertson has received donations in kind from sporting and other organisations for admittance to and entertainment at sporting events. On 17June 2021, Robertson  and his wife received hospitality at Ascot valued at £2,800. The donor was the Betting and Gaming Council in London.

On 15 July 2021, Robertson received admittance to and hospitality from the Royal St George’s Golf Club, Sandwich for the Open Championship with a total value of £700. The donor was the Royal and Ancient Golf Club. (Donation registered on 6 July 2021.)

Government positions 
In September 2001, Robertson was appointed an Opposition Whip. In June 2003, was made Shadow Minister for Trade and Industry. In November 2003, he was appointed a Shadow Minister for Economic Affairs and from May 2005, he served as the Shadow Minister for Northern Ireland. He was not given a ministerial position in the 2010 Parliament, but served as chair of the Northern Ireland Affairs Committee until July 2017 when Andrew Murrison succeeded Robertson as chair.

Votes 
Robertson opposes gay marriage, and has consistently voted against equal rights for homosexual couples. In December 2012, when the UK Government consulted on plans to extend marriage to same-sex couples, he said in Parliament: "Let me point out that although there are religious and civil ceremonies, there is only one marriage, and many people of all faiths and no faith are deeply offended—I repeat, deeply offended—by these proposals."

In December 2014, Robertson along with six other male Conservative Party MPs voted against the Equal Pay (Transparency) Bill which would require all companies with more than 250 employees to declare the gap in pay between the average male and average female salaries.

Robertson is against HS2 and has continued to vote against new high speed rail infrastructure.

Northern Ireland 
Robertson notes that although "the events in the Province didn't immediately affect me, they had an impact on my thinking and ended up having an enormous influence on my career."

In Parliament, Robertson was Chairman of the Northern Ireland Affairs Select Committee between 2010 and 2017. The committee contained 13 members, including members from the Conservative and Labour Parties, the DUP, UUP, SDLP and an Independent. During his time as chair, the subjects of the inquiries and reports included the Saville Inquiry (Bloody Sunday), the Letters of Comfort Inquiry, Corporation Tax, Banking, Leaving the EU and others.

Robertson was also Chairman of the British Irish Parliamentary Assembly between 2012 and 2016. This group included MPs and Lords, as well as TDs and Senators, from both British and Irish Parliaments, as well as members of the devolved administrations.

In 2017, Robertson received a Metropolitan Police shield for his work championing IRA bomb victims. Robertson continues to lead calls for compensation to be given to victims of IRA attacks that used Libyan explosives.

Robertson created the All-Party Parliamentary Group on the Union in September 2019 which seeks to "To promote the economic, social, cultural and constitutional benefits of the union of the United Kingdom of Great Britain and Northern Ireland; To foster good relations between the four countries of the UK and their devolved administrations; and for connected purposes". He is chairman of the group.

Brexit 
A strong Eurosceptic, Robertson campaigned for John Redwood in the Conservative leadership contest in 1995 and is active in the EU pressure group Better Off Out. He is a member of the pressure group The Freedom Association. He opposes devolution and the Good Friday Agreement in Northern Ireland.

In mid-November 2018, following publication of the draft UK Brexit Withdrawal Agreement, Robertson submitted to the Chairman of the 1922 Committee of the Conservative Party a letter confirming he had no confidence in the Conservative Party leader and Prime Minister Theresa May. Robertson became the first of a long list to confirm his letter, after the government announced details of its draft Withdrawal Agreement with the EU.

Interest in Africa 
Throughout his life, Robertson has had a particular interest in Africa.

He is a member of multiple All Party Parliamentary groups (APPG) for African nations, including: Chairman of the APPG for Ethiopia and Djibouti, Vice Chairman of the APPG for Angola and Vice Chairman of the APPG for Nigeria.

As Chairman of the APPG for Ethiopia, Robertson has worked with the Ethiopian Embassy, committing to further strengthen Ethio-UK relations in the UK.

Throughout his career, Robertson has been an advocate for the continuation of the UKs ODA spend and girl's education across the continent. Whilst chairing a debate in 2019, Robertson spoke of his time in Ethiopia, noting:"I have witnessed situations in which girls have had to walk a number of miles every day to collect water to bring back to their families. That is neither sustainable nor efficient. It keeps the girls away from school, it prevents any progress from being made in the neighbourhood and it is wrong. We have to do a lot more to help in those situations".

Following the merger of the Foreign and Commonwealth Office (FCO) and Department for International Development (DIFID) in June 2020, Robertson released a statement noting that he had "mixed feelings". In the statement, Robertson flagged his concern regarding the shifting balance towards aid in line the UKs interests over helping the world's poorest.

In his discussion with the prime minister, Robertson emphasised that helping the world's poorest is the UK's interests, nonetheless it is important to continue humanitarian work. "I asked him [Prime Minister] to guarantee that, following the merger, we would continue our poverty reduction programmes across the world, and continue to provide health and education projects, particularly for girls, and he agreed that the latter in particular was one of the most important things we could do."

UK-Africa trade 
In October 2020, Robertson was appointed as the Prime Minister's Trade Envoy to Angola and Zambia. Robertson is one of 29 trade envoys covering 67 markets who are appointed by the Prime Minister to promote trade and encourage investment within the UK. He was removed from this position in December 2021 after rebelling on new COVID-19 related restrictions, following the Omicron variant.

Before being appointed, Robertson led trade missions across the African continent. Notable trips include his missions to Nigeria, Rwanda, Uganda and Ethiopia and Djibouti.

In July 2018, Robertson encouraged then Secretary of State for International Development Penny Mordaunt to offer better trade deals to developing countries in Africa once the UK had left the European Union.

Outside of Parliament, Robertson is chairman of the Westminster Africa Business Group, who bring together both business and political activities across Africa to encourage trade relationships.

The group regularly hold events at  the House  of  Commons, including lunches, receptions and other meeting attended by businesses, ministers, MPs, ambassadors and High Commissioners from both the UK and Africa.

Personal life

Robertson is a practising Christian. In May 1989, Robertson married Susan Lees at All Saints Church in Farnworth. In 2002, he had an affair with Claire Parker, his constituency secretary, who was married. In 2005, Robertson and Lees divorced.

In September 2011, details published by the Independent Parliamentary Standards Authority (IPSA) revealed that Robertson was spending up to £35,000 on his partner Anne Marie "Annie" Adams as his office manager and up to £30,000 on his estranged wife Susan Robertson as his senior secretary (at a combined cost to the taxpayer of £65,000). 

Under rules introduced by IPSA in 2010, Robertson would not be allowed to employ both women because MPs are limited to one 'connected' person or family member on their staff. However, because the arrangement was in place before the rule change it is allowed to continue.

On 7 February 2015, Robertson married Annie Adams, in St Mary Undercroft by the Chaplain to the Speaker of the House of Commons. The couple live in Tewkesbury and own a pair of award-winning Miniature Dachshunds named Sausage and Tiger.

References

External links
 
 
 Laurence Robertson MP Biography at the site of the Conservative Party
 Gloucestershire Conservatives – Laurence Robertson MP
 BBC News – Laurence Robertson profile 10 February 2005
 Ordered out of the Commons in March 2005
 Naming an irish bomber in October 2004

1958 births
Living people
English Christians
Conservative Party (UK) MPs for English constituencies
British Eurosceptics
People from Bolton
People educated at Farnworth Grammar School
Alumni of the University of Bolton
UK MPs 1997–2001
UK MPs 2001–2005
UK MPs 2005–2010
UK MPs 2010–2015
UK MPs 2015–2017
UK MPs 2017–2019
UK MPs 2019–present